is a former Japanese football player.

Playing career
Kosugi was born in Tokyo on June 20, 1968. After graduating from Doshisha University, he joined the J1 League club Nagoya Grampus Eight in 1992. He played often, mainly as side back, during his first season. However his opportunity to play decreased in 1995. He moved to the Japan Football League club Brummell Sendai in 1996. Although he played often in 1996, his opportunity to play decreased in 1997 and he retired at the end of the 1997 season.

Club statistics

References

External links

J.League Profile

1968 births
Living people
Doshisha University alumni
Association football people from Tokyo
Japanese footballers
J1 League players
Japan Football League (1992–1998) players
Nagoya Grampus players
Vegalta Sendai players
Association football defenders